Shanghai Jincai Experimental Junior Middle School, founded in 2001, is a junior middle school located in Pudong New District, Shanghai, China.

References

Schools in Shanghai
Pudong